, often shortened to , is a Japanese television drama aired by Nippon Television between 1986 and 1987. Starring Hiroshi Tachi and Kyohei Shibata, the series became very popular and spawned films, spin-offs series, and books. The series follows a pair of detectives, Toshiki Takayama (Hiroshi Tachi) and Yuji Oshita (Kyôhei Shibata), from the Naka-ku branch of the Kanagawa Prefectural Police.

Several model cars based on Nissan automobiles featured in the show were produced by model company Aoshima Bunka Kyozai.

On February 6, 1990, a video game based on the series titled Mottomo Abunai Deka was released by Nintendo Famicom.

Cast
Hiroshi Tachi : Toshiki Takayama (Taka)
Kyohei Shibata : Yūji Ōshita(Yūji)
Tōru Nakamura : Tōru Machida
Atsuko Asano : Kaoru Mayama
Michihiro Yamanishi : Yoshii
Bengal : Fumio Tanaka
Nana Kinomi : Yuko Matsumura
Shizuo Chūjō : Takuzō Kondō

Film
 Abunai Deka (1987) directed by Yasuharu Hasebe
 Matamata Abunai Deka (1988) directed by Haruo Ichikura
 Mottomo Abunai Deka (1989) directed by Tōru Murakawa
 Abunai Deka Returns (1996) directed by Tōru Murakawa
 Abunai Deka Forever The Movie (1998) directed by Yusuke Narita
 Madamada Abunai Deka (2005) directed by Kunio Torii
 Saraba Abunai Deka (2016) directed by Tōru Murakawa

References

Japanese drama television series
Japanese police procedural television series
Japanese detective television drama series